Bothriomyrmex costae is a species of ant in the genus Bothriomyrmex. Described by Emery in 1869, the species is endemic to Italy.

References

Bothriomyrmex
Hymenoptera of Europe
Insects described in 1869